Slave to the Game is the fifth studio album by American metalcore band Emmure, released on April 10, 2012, through Victory Records. The record was produced by Joey Sturgis, who also did production on the band's previous album Speaker of the Dead. It is the first album to feature drummer Mark Castillo, following the band parting ways with their former drummer Mike Kaabe in October 2011.

Slave to the Game is the band's highest charting album to date, peaking number 58 on the Billboard 200, and number 11 on the Top Independent chart. Despite its success, the album is frontman Frankie Palmeri’s least favorite out of the band’s work. In 2015 interview, Palmeri considered the album to be a “commercial failure” and said “The songs suck. It’s just not good. None of the riffs are good. I just don’t like it. I feel bad ‘cause I let that record happen.”

Background and promotion
It was announced on November 19, 2011 that Emmure would be heading into the studio with producer Joey Sturgis to record the album in January 2012. Following this announcement, in January 2012, guitarist Jesse Ketive announced on his Facebook that the band had entered the studio and that they had employed drummer Mark Castillo to track drums on the album. Castillo later announced that his position in Emmure would be permanent. On January 20, 2012, Emmure announced through Victory Records that their new album would be named Slave to the Game.

On February 14, 2012, Victory Records released a teaser video promoting the album, revealing the album's cover art. In an interview with Alternative Press in promotion of the album, vocalist Frankie Palmeri said "It’s just a heavy fucking record. It’s another Emmure record that hopefully people get to enjoy with us, because we dig it and that’s what it comes down to. We just make albums we try to enjoy and hopefully people can come along for the ride."

On March 7, 2012, the first single from Slave to the Game, titled "Protoman", was released through the band's Vevo account. The band would later announce that "Protoman", as well as a second single entitled "I Am Onslaught", would be available as digital singles on both iTunes and Amazon.com on March 13, 2012. On May 25, 2012, it was announced that Emmure was recording a video for their song "MDMA", thus making it the third single from Slave to the Game.

Track listing

Track title references
Track one's title is a reference to a person inserting coins into an arcade game, which is the concept of the album
Track two's title is a reference to Proto Man, a character in Mega Man.
Track three is a reference to Deadpool, a Marvel anti-hero. Sang from the perspective of Thanos
Track four is a reference to Marvel supervillain Onslaught.
Track five is a reference to Bison - a Street Fighter character. The song's lyrics also make a reference to Vega, a Grand Master bodyguard for Bison's faction Shadaloo.
Track six is a reference to the Marvel character Poltergeist, a mutant with the uncontrollable ability to cause unlikely events to occur.
Track seven is a reference to an attack in Marvel vs. Capcom 3: Fate of Two Worlds.
Track eight is a reference to Dormammu, a Marvel supervillain, as well as the character's sister, Umar.
Track nine is a reference to Blackheart, who is a demon in Marvel comic books. The lyrics also make reference to Mephisto, Blackheart's creator.
Track ten is a reference to MDMA, the legal abbreviation of the seratonin production increasing drug known popularly as "ecstasy" and/or "molly".
Track twelve is an abbreviation for artificial intelligence; which refers to the computerized actions and personalities in video game characters.

Personnel
Emmure
 Mark Castillo - drums
 Mark Davis - bass guitar
 Jesse Ketive - lead guitar
 Mike Mulholland - rhythm guitar
 Frankie Palmeri - vocals

Production
Produced by Joey Sturgis, Ash Avildsen, Shawn Keith & Emmure
Engineered by Joey Sturgis & Allan Hessler
Mixed & mastered by Joey Sturgis
Produced vocals by Ash Avildsen, Shawn Keith, Nick Walters & Frankie Palmeri
Editing by Jeff Dunne
Management by Shawn Keith
Booking by Amanda Fiore (The Pantheon Agency) & Marco Walzel (Avocado Booking)
Artwork by Daniel McBride
Art direction by Double J & Frankie Palmeri
Layout by Double J
Photo by Double J, Eric Richter, Robert Scheuerman & Dustin Smith

References

2012 albums
Emmure albums
Victory Records albums
Albums produced by Joey Sturgis